William O. Perkins III (born February 2, 1969) is an American hedge fund manager, film producer and high stakes poker player from Houston, Texas. Perkins focuses on venture capital and energy markets. He founded Small Ventures USA, L.P in 1997 and later joined Centaurus Energy in 2002. He currently manages Houston-based energy hedge fund, Skylar Capital.

Perkins grew up in Jersey City, New Jersey the son of football player and politician Bill Perkins and nephew of football player Don Perkins. He graduated from St. Peter's Preparatory School in 1986. In 2016, he contributed $1.5 million towards the construction of the William O. Perkins III '86 Athletic Center at his alma mater.

Bill Perkins is also the author of the book Die with Zero and hosts a website with tips and tricks related to his philosophy.

Career
Perkins studied Electrical and Electronics Engineering from the University of Iowa. After graduation he worked under natural gas trader John D. Arnold for several years before starting his own hedge fund. During his 12-year career, Perkins directed NorthernStar Natural Gas and was the CEO of Cutuco Energy Central America. Perkins actively traded the stock market turning a $1.25 million profit trading Goldman Sachs in September 2008. In 2009 Perkins became involved in film production, producing various films including After.Life (2009), Unthinkable (2010), and Cat Run (2011).

Poker
Perkins is a poker player and has entered multiple events including the World Series of Poker, Big One for One Drop, PokerStars Big Game,  PokerStars Caribbean Adventure and "High stakes poker" as well as Poker Night On Wall Street. Perkins is friends with Dan Bilzerian and they are often seen together.

As of 2019, his total live tournament winnings exceed $5,400,000 of which $1,965,163 have come from his One Drop cash at the WSOP.

References

External links 
 
 Bill Perkins Hendon Mob profile

American hedge fund managers
American investors
American poker players
American money managers
Living people
Businesspeople from Houston
People from Jersey City, New Jersey
St. Peter's Preparatory School alumni
1969 births
American art collectors